Nazie Eftekhari is an Iranian-American and founder and principal architect of HealthEZ and founder of The Araz Group. She is a speaker, philanthropist, human rights activist, and innovator. Her background includes over 30 years of health care experience focusing on networks, self-insured employers and technology development and implementation, as well as business experience. Eftekhari is a graduate of the London School of Economics, Master's in International Relations from University of Southern California and also holds a master's degree in Healthcare Administration from the University of Minnesota.

Honorifics and awards

Eftekhari most recently received the 2011 International Immigrant Achievement Award from The International Leadership Institute. In 2009, she was chosen Woman of the Year by the Bloomington Chamber of Commerce, and in 2004, the Minneapolis-St. Paul Business Journal named her one of the Twin Cities' Women Changemakers. In 1995, Eftekhari was named Small Business Person of the Year. Amongst her other awards are The Minnesota Advocates for Human Rights Award, the Woman of Distinction Award, and the 2011 International Immigrant Achievement Citizen Award.

Political Activism

Eftekhari serves on the board of We Choose, the organizing committee of the 2013 Iranian Virtual Elections. Ms. Eftekhari also serves on the board of the University of Minnesota Medical School, Carlson School of Management (University of Minnesota) and the Walker Art Center.  She is also on the board of The Iranian American Political Action Committee (IAPAC), the Directors Board of the Nonviolent Initiative for Democracy (NID), is a founding member of the Yalda Network: Mothers and Others for Iran. She interviews frequently on the Voice of America Persian News Network and previously served on the board of directors of the Public Affairs Alliance of Iranian Americans.

Eftekhari grew up in Iran and has been politically active on issues concerning Iran.

References and Notes

American women chief executives
American people of Iranian descent
University of Minnesota School of Public Health alumni
Living people
American health care chief executives
Year of birth missing (living people)
21st-century American women